Krepostnoy Zilair (Krepostnoy Yılayır) is a rural locality (a village) in Ishberdinsky Selsoviet, Baymaksky District, Bashkortostan, Russia. The population was 142 as of 2010. There are 5 streets.

Geography 
Krepostnoy Zilair is located 65 km southwest of Baymak (the district's administrative centre) by road. Ishberda is the nearest rural locality.

References 

Rural localities in Baymaksky District